The Pará mangroves (NT1427) is an ecoregion along the Atlantic coast of the state of Pará in Brazil.
They constitute the western extension of the Maranhão mangroves ecoregion.
The mangroves are relatively intact, although they are under some pressure from agriculture and logging.

Location
They include a stretch of the Atlantic coast of Marajó island, and the Marajó Bay and Atlantic coasts of mainland Pará.
They adjoin the western part of the Maranhão mangroves ecoregion, stretching from near Belém on the Pará River along the coast of eastern Pará state to the border of Maranhão state.
The mangroves adjoin the Tocantins–Araguaia–Maranhão moist forests further inland and the Marajó várzea at the mouth of the Amazon River.
The ecoregion contains about 28% of the total mangrove area in Brazil.
They are part of the larger Amazon–Orinoco–Southern Caribbean mangroves global ecoregion, which also includes the Maranhão mangroves, Amapá mangroves and Guianan mangroves.

Physical

The terrain consists of islands and mudflats created from fine-grained sediments and clay deposited by the Amazon, which are colonized as they form and stabilized by the salt-tolerant mangroves.

The climate is tropical, warm and humid.

Ecology

The  ecoregion is in the Neotropical realm and the mangrove biome.
Mangroves form a continuous belt along the Pará and Maranhão coasts, with six species of mangrove trees and several associated species.
They are important as a nursery for fish and in protecting the coast, and provide an important source of food and other resources to the local human population.
The mangroves benefit from the constant influx of fresh water from rainfall and from the Amazon River. 
However, they must compete with freshwater hardwood species typical of the Amazon rainforest.

Flora

The most common mangrove tree species in Rhizophora mangle, which dominates estuaries that are most exposed to the ocean.
Rhizophora mangle reaches  in height.
Rhizophora racemosa is less common, found only in Pará only in Marajó Bay, as is Rhizophora harrisonii, intermediate in salt tolerance between these two.
Avicennia germinans is common on higher areas with less flooding, and under more saline conditions.
Avicennia schaueriana is less common, mainly found near sandy beaches.
Avicennia schaueriana may reach  in height.
Laguncularia racemosa is found along the coast in saline and brackish environments, mostly along forest edges and other open spaces.

The transition zone between the coastal mangroves and inland dry forest holds Rhizophora racemosa, Rhizophora harrisonii, Laguncularia racemosa and Conocarpus erectus mangroves, as well as Spartina alterniflora on the seaward margin and Hibiscus tiliaceus and Acrostichum aureum on the landward margins. 
Tropical forest and palm species that grow with the mangroves include Dalbergia brownei, Rhabdadenia biflora, Montrichardia arborescens, Mora oleifera, açaí palm (Euterpe oleracea) and Orbygnia martiana.

Fauna
Rare and endangered fauna include scarlet ibis (Eudocimus ruber), wattled jacana (Jacana jacana), tucuxi (Sotalia fluviatilis), West Indian manatee (Trichechus manatus), green sea turtle (Chelonia mydas) and leatherback sea turtle (Dermochelys coriacea).

Status

The World Wildlife Fund gives the ecoregion the status of "Relatively Stable/Intact".
The mangroves are inaccessible, and population density is low, so much of the habitat is intact other than the city of Belém and its surroundings.
The mangroves are used by artisanal fishermen as a source of crabs and wood.
Threats include subsistence agriculture and livestock raising, tourism, logging, mining and urban development.

Notes

Sources

Neotropical ecoregions
Ecoregions of Brazil
Amazon biome
Environment of Pará